Bichoristes wareni is a species of sea snail, a marine gastropod mollusk in the family Lepetellidae.

Description

Distribution

References

External links

Lepetellidae
Gastropods described in 1992